Alvdal is a village in Alvdal Municipality in Innlandet county, Norway. Alvdal Church is located in the village.

The Norwegian National Road 3 runs through the village. The Rørosbanen railway line also passes through the village, stopping at Alvdal Station.

References

Alvdal
Villages in Innlandet
Populated places on the Glomma River